A takyeh ( takye; plural:  takâyâ) is a building where Shia Muslims gather to mourn Husayn's death in the month of Muharram.

Takyeh or Takiyeh or Takieh or Tekyah or Takeyeh or Tekeyeh may also refer to:
 Takyeh, Hamadan
 Tekyeh, Isfahan
 Takyeh, Kerman
 Tekyah, Kermanshah
 Tekeyeh-ye Sofla, Kermanshah
 Takyeh-ye Teymur, Kermanshah Province
 Takyeh, Khuzestan
 Takyeh, Kohgiluyeh and Boyer-Ahmad
 Tekiyeh, Kurdistan
 Takyeh-ye Galin, Kurdistan Province
 Tekeyeh-ye Hashmiz, Kurdistan Province
 Takyeh-ye Olya, Kurdistan Province
 Takyeh-ye Sofla, Kurdistan Province
 Takyeh, Komijan, Markazi Province
 Takyeh, Shazand, Markazi Province
 Tekyeh Aghasht, Alborz Province
 Takyeh, West Azerbaijan
 Təkyə, is a village in the Davachi Rayon of Azerbaijan